The women's singles competition of the 2021 World Table Tennis Championships was held from 23 to 29 November 2021. Liu Shiwen was the defending champion but did not compete in this year's tournament.

Wang Manyu won the title after defeating Sun Yingsha 11–13, 11–7, 6–11, 11–6, 11–8, 17–15.

Seeds
Seeding was based on the ITTF world ranking published on 16 November 2021.

  Chen Meng (semifinals)
  Sun Yingsha (final)
  Mima Ito (quarterfinals)
  Wang Manyu '(champion)
  Cheng I-ching (fourth round)  Kasumi Ishikawa (quarterfinals)  Wang Yidi (semifinals)  Feng Tianwei (third round)  Miu Hirano (fourth round)  Doo Hoi Kem (fourth round)  Jeon Ji-hee (third round)  Chen Xingtong (quarterfinals)  Sofia Polcanova (first round)  Adriana Díaz (fourth round)  Hina Hayata (fourth round)  Petrissa Solja (second round)  Ying Han (third round)  Suh Hyo-won (quarterfinals)  Bernadette Szőcs (fourth round)  Chen Szu-yu (third round)  Britt Eerland (second round)  Margaryta Pesotska (third round)  Nina Mittelham (first round)  Elizabeta Samara (second round)  Minnie Soo (first round)  Lily Zhang (third round)  Dina Meshref (third round)  Shan Xiaona (third round)  Suthasini Sawettabut (fourth round)  Mo Zhang (second round)  Ni Xialian (third round)  Hana Matelová (second round)''

Draw

Finals

Top half

Section 1

Section 2

Section 3

Section 4

Bottom half

Section 5

Section 6

Section 7

Section 8

References

External links
Draw

Women's singles